The Chinese Community Center at 60-64 Mott Street is home to both the Chinese Consolidated Benevolent Association (CCBA), the oldest Chinese community service organization of Chinatown established in 1883, and New York Chinese School, established in 1909 for children who came from overseas; both are located in the same Manhattan Chinatown building in New York City. The building itself is considered a Chinatown "town hall". Both the New York Chinese School and the CCBA are affiliated.

Chinese Consolidated Benevolent Association

In the early history of the organization, it performed a quasi-governmental role for the Chinatown community and financially supported many Chinese residents who had goals to become a business owner as well as providing them training. The parent organization of the Chinese Community Center, the CCBA was founded in 1883 and has represented and served the needs of Chinese Americans in New York City ever since.

Historically it has performed a quasi-governmental role in the Chinese community.  Throughout its history, business ownership has been a goal of many residents of Chinatown, and has been supported both financially, and through training, by the CCBA.  Today there are local CCBA agencies in 26 cities with substantial Chinese populations across North America.

Currently, the CCBA represents the Chinese Americans living in the Greater New York Metro area.  Internally, the CCBA is the hinge that keeps the Chinese American community intact and vigorous.  Specifically, the CCBA:
 Provides social services
 Provides personal and commercial conflict resolution and mediations
 Promotes Chinese traditions and cultural heritage
 Serves as a bridge between Chinese American immigrants and mainstream groups
 Promotes Chinese American interests
 Engages in charitable activities
 Sponsors educational and recreational activities
 Sponsors and promotes youth services
 Provides and advocates for small businesses

Today the organization provides services ranging from social services, training in personal and commercial conflict issues and mediation, preserving Chinese Culture as well as helping Chinese Americans to integrate well with mainstream groups, being involved with Chinese-American interests, engages in charity events, sponsorships to educational related activities, and advocate for small businesses. Additional services that are provided to the community are low cost rate Adult English Classes, Naturalization Service, and free tax services.

In New York City, the CCBA is an umbrella organization of 60 member organizations representing a cross-section of New York's Chinese community. Other Chinese Associations affiliated with the CCBA located on Mott Street are Hoy Sing Ning Yung Association, Lin Sing Association, Chinese Merchants Association, Chinese Free Mason's, Kuomintang Eastern Region Office/Kuomintang of China in America (New York), Hok Shan Society, Chinese Aviation Development Association, Eng Suey Sun Association, Lee's Family Association, Yee Tung Association, Chew Lun Association, Soo Yuen Association, Leung Chung How Realty Corp., Hoy Yen Association, Hoy Ping Hong Hing Association, Jin Lan Association, Fung Loon Benevolent Association, Goon Shee Association, and Lum Sai Ho Association.

There are many more affiliated Chinese Associations located throughout the Chinatown neighborhood. Other large organizations that they have relationships with are Greater Chinatown Community Association, Chinatown Partnership Local Development Corporation, New York Chinese School, Chinatown Day Care Center, Greater New York Chinese Community Dollars of Scholars, including mainstream organizations such as American Cancer Society, and American Red Cross Greater New York.

New York Chinese School

The New York Chinese School (紐約華僑學校) is a non-profit 501(c)(3) school, housed in the Chinese Community Centre.  It has become so synonymous for students to say they attend Chinese school at 中華公所 instead of 紐約華僑學校.

It initially opened with 20 students. Today, there are more than 3,000 students in grade levels ranging from kindergarten to high school and it has a faculty of approximately 50 people.

There are weekday after-school classes from 3:30pm to 6:30pm as well as the more popular weekend morning and afternoon classes, held Saturday or Sundays from 10am-1pm, or 2-5pm. Both Cantonese and Mandarin language classes are available. Historically, the majority of classes, especially upper level classes, were taught in Cantonese, but recently Mandarin classes have outnumbered Cantonese classes by a 3:1 ratio and students studying Mandarin have outnumbered those studying Cantonese.  All classes are taught traditional Chinese writing (currently used in Taiwan in contrast to the simplified writing currently used in the PRC).

Music and art classes have been taught for many years and continue to this day. Additionally, the school has a summer camp. Recently, adult Mandarin classes have opened up.

References

External links
, New York Chinese School
, New York Chinese Consolidated Benevolent Association

Chinatown, Manhattan
Chinese-American organizations
Buildings and structures completed in the 19th century
Private elementary schools in Manhattan
Private middle schools in Manhattan
Private high schools in Manhattan
Organizations based in New York City
Ethnic fraternal orders in the United States
1883 establishments in New York (state)
1909 establishments in New York City